Jerzy Tyszkiewicz (1596–1656) was auxiliary bishop of Vilnius from 1627 to 1633, bishop of Samogitia from 1633 to 1649, and bishop of Vilnius from 1649 to 1656.

Biography
He was born in Vistyčy to a prominent noble family of Tyszkiewicz.

Educated in Jesuit academies, he took the Holy Orders in 1622. He served as the canon in Kraków and later, Vilnius. In 1637, he founded a monastery in what would become the town of Žemaičių Kalvarija. Using his personal wealth, he built churches in Surviliškis, Kuliai, Laukžemė, Pušalotas and in other Lithuanian places. He was author of the several Lithuanian language prayers and hymns.  
 
He was seen as an active administrator, politician and diplomat.

References

Bibliography 
 Nitecki P., Biskupi Kościoła w Polsce: w latach 965-1999. Słownik biograficzny, wyd. 2, Warszawa 2000, pp. 458-459.
 Wileński słownik biograficzny, Bydgoszcz 2002, p. 412.

External links 
 Bishop Jerzy Tyszkiewicz

1596 births
1656 deaths
People from Vilkaviškis District Municipality
Jerzy
Canons of Kraków
Bishops of Vilnius
17th-century Polish nobility
Ecclesiastical senators of the Polish–Lithuanian Commonwealth
17th-century Roman Catholic bishops in the Polish–Lithuanian Commonwealth